Devon is a settlement in Sedibeng District Municipality in the Gauteng province of South Africa.

History
Village some 18 km west of Leslie and 40 km east-south-east of Springs. Named after the home county in England of the surveyor who laid it out. Important for natural gas in the vicinity.

References

Populated places in the Lesedi Local Municipality